Acaill Bheag (Achillbeg) is a small island in County Mayo, Ireland, just off the southern tip of Achill Island.

Etymology 
Its name means Little Achill.

History 
Acaill Bheag was evacuated in 1965 after being inhabited for over 3000 years and the inhabitants were settled on the main (Achill) island and nearby mainland. The main settlement was in the centre of the island, bounded by two hills to the north and south. There are a small number of holiday homes on the island, but they are usually empty for most of the year. Access to the island is from Cé Mhór, in the village of An Chloich Mhór (Cloghmore), by local arrangement. A lighthouse on Acaill Bheag's southern tip was completed in 1965.

A comprehensive book about the life and times of the island and the people and way of life there, "Achillbeg - The Life of an Island", by Jonathan Beaumont was published in 2005.

The Irish artist Pete Hogan wrote a book about his time spent living on the island in 1983, The Artist on the Island: An Achill Journal which was published in 2013.

Demographics 
The table below reports data on Achillbeg's population taken from Discover the Islands of Ireland (1999) and the Census of Ireland.

References

Islands of County Mayo
Ghost towns in Europe
Villages in Achill Island
Achill Island